SES-5 (also known as Astra 4B and Sirius 5) is a commercial geostationary communication satellite operated by SES S.A. It was launched on 9 July 2012. The launch was arranged by International Launch Services (ILS).

History 
In October 2008, SES Sirius AB of Sweden (then 90% owned by SES and prior to 2003 called Nordic Satellite AB) ordered the Sirius 5 satellite from Space Systems/Loral. Following full acquisition by SES in 2010, SES Sirius was renamed SES Astra (a subsidiary of SES) and the satellite renamed Astra 4B. In 2011, SES Astra was merged back into SES and the satellite renamed SES-5.

Satellite description 
It was constructed by Space Systems/Loral, and is based on the SSL 1300 satellite bus. It carries 24 C-band and 36 Ku-band transponders. It covers Atlantic Ocean, Sub-Saharan Africa, North Africa, Europe, Middle East.

EGNOSS payload 
SES 5 is also carrying a hosted payload L-band navigation terminal for the executive commission of the 27-nation European Union. The terminal operated as part of the European Geostationary Navigation Overlay Service (EGNOS) system, which provides verification of Global Positioning System (GPS) navigation signals through the use of satellites in geostationary orbit.

Launch 
Sirius 5 was the original name of the SES-5 satellite. SES-5 that was launched on 9 July 2012, at 18:38:30 UTC from Baikonur Cosmodrome, Site 81/24 and is now co-located with Astra 4A (Sirius 4) at 5° East. This satellite provides a similar European and African coverage as Astra 4A.

See also 

SES
Astra
SES Sirius
SES Astra
High Above (book)
2012 in spaceflight

References

External links 
 Mission Control, SES-5 Mission, SES-5 Blog
 SES-5 now operational at 5 degrees East
 SES-5 ny satellit med flera frekvensband för Europa, Afrika och Mellanöstern
 SES-5
 SES-5 at International Media Switzerland

SES satellites
Communications satellites in geostationary orbit
Spacecraft launched in 2012
Satellites using the SSL 1300 bus
Satellites of Luxembourg